Jilin Township is a township under the administration of Jidong County in southeastern Heilongjiang, China. , it has six villages under its administration:
Jilin Village
Dongxing Village
Dongming Village
Jinxing Village
Yongguang Village
Qianjin Village

References 

Township-level divisions of Heilongjiang
Jidong County